The presidential election of 2007 in the Republika Srpska entity of Bosnia and Herzegovina was announced after the premature death of President Milan Jelić on 30 September 2007 and was held on 9 December 2007. Until the election took place, Igor Radojičić, also from the ruling Alliance of Independent Social Democrats, was acting president. The election had to be called within fifteen days of Jelić's death; it was called on 11 October 2007, with candidates to be nominated by 16 October 2007.

Candidates
There were ten candidates, with the frontrunners being the Republika Srpska Academy of Sciences chairman Rajko Kuzmanović of the ruling Alliance of Independent Social Democrats, MP Ognjen Tadić of the main opposition Serbian Democratic Party, and former Prime Minister of Republika Srpska and Bosnia and Herzegovina Foreign Minister Mladen Ivanić of the Party of Democratic Progress.

All three main candidates supported Republika Srpska's status in Bosnia and Herzegovina and the Dayton Accords. President of Serbia Boris Tadić and the Democratic Party in Serbia supported the SNSD and its candidate Kuzmanović. According to the electoral law, there would be no run-off.

The other candidates were:
 Mirko Blagojević of the Serbian Radical Party "Dr. Vojislav Šešelj"
 Slobodan Popović of the Social Democratic Party
 Krsto Jandrić of the National Democratic Party
 Anton Josipović of the People's Party Work for Prosperity
 Nedžad Delić of the Democratic Party of the Disabled
 Dragan Đokanović independent candidate
 Nikola Lazarević of the European Ecological Party E5

Results
According to unofficial results (with 55% of the votes counted), Kuzmanović won the election with 44.53% of the votes to Tadić's 33.28% and Ivanić's 16%. Turnout was close to 36%.

Official results released on 2007-12-17 confirmed these preliminary results. Kuzmanović was sworn in on 2007-12-28.

References

Republika Srpska
Elections in Republika Srpska
2007 in Bosnia and Herzegovina
Republika Srpska